Dampierre-sur-le-Doubs (literally Dampierre on the Doubs) is a commune in the Doubs department in the Bourgogne-Franche-Comté region in eastern France.

Population

See also
 Doubs (river)
 Communes of the Doubs department

References

Communes of Doubs